Charles Frederick Geggus (March 25, 1862 – January 16, 1917), was a professional baseball player who pitched and played center field for one season in Major League Baseball.  He played for the  Washington Nationals of the Union Association.

References

External links

1862 births
1917 deaths
Major League Baseball pitchers
Baseball players from San Francisco
19th-century baseball players
Washington Nationals (UA) players
Saint Mary's Gaels baseball players
San Francisco Mystics players
San Francisco Nationals players
San Francisco Reno players
San Francisco Haverlys players
Reading Actives players
Washington Nationals (minor league) players
Newark Domestics players
Sacramento Altas players